The Lions de Genève are a professional basketball club based in the city of Geneva, Switzerland. The Lions currently play in the Swiss top-tier Swiss Basketball League (SBL).  The team is based in the 2,000 capacity Pavillon des Sports.

History
Founded as the Genève Devils in the summer of 2000, the club rebranded itself as Les Lions de Genève in 2010 after merging with Meyrin Grand-Saconnex.

Trophies
Total trophies: 11
Swiss Basketball League (2):
2012–13, 2014–15
Swiss Cup (4):
2003–04, 2013–14, 2016–17, 2020–21
SBL Cup (5):
2003–04, 2012–13, 2014–15, 2019, 2021

Current roster

Notable players 
To appear in this section a player must have played at least two seasons for the club AND either:
– Set a club record or won an individual award as a professional player.
– Played at least one official international match for his senior national team at any time.

Head coaches
  Rodrigue M'Baye
  Ivan Rudež
  Jean-Marc Jaumin: (2016–2017) 
  Vedran Bosnić: (2017–2019)  
  Andrej Štimac: (2020–2022)
  Alain Attalah: (2022–present)

References

External links
Official Lions de Genève website
Profile - Eurobasket.com
Profile - Facebook.com
Profile (fans) - Facebook.com

Basketball teams established in 2000
Basketball teams in Switzerland
Sport in Geneva